Islami Bank Bangladesh Ltd. (IBBL) is an Islamic banking company based in Bangladesh. It became incorporated on 13 March 1983 as a public limited company under the Companies Act 1913.  IBBL maintains its own ATM Booths with a country-wide shared ATM network. IBBL has been the largest private banking network in Bangladesh. When IBBL was established, it was the first bank in Southeast Asia to provide banking service based on Shariah. The bank has been listed with both Dhaka Stock Exchange Ltd. and Chittagong Stock Exchange Ltd.

History 
Islami Bank Bangladesh Limited is a shari'ah compliant bank in Bangladesh which started operations on 30 March 1983. It was founded by Saudi and Kuwaiti investors. It is a public limited company registered under the Companies Act of 1913. IBBL is a joint venture of the government of Bangladesh, 22 businessmen of Bangladesh, Islamic Development Bank, and investment firms and banks from Muslim Middle Eastern countries.

According to The Economist, "Islami Bank was a pioneer in financing Bangladesh’s rise as the apparel industry’s main production base outside China."

As of 2017, Islami Bank Bangladesh commands 90% of Islamic-banking assets and deposits in Bangladesh, is the country's biggest private lender overall, has 12 million depositors and a balance-sheet of $10 billion.

Major shareholders of IBBL 

 Islamic Development Bank (Islami Bank Bangladesh's biggest institutional investor. Reduced its stake from 7.5% to 2.1% following controversial 2017 government "takeover")
 Dubai Islami Bank
 Kuwait Finance House
 Luxembourg Islami Bank
 Three ministers of Kuwait
 Al Rajhi Bank

63% shared owned by the above shareholders and 60,000 people of Bangladesh are owners of the rest 37 percent shares.

Change of Ownership and following controversies

In 2017, the bank had a sudden change in its ownership and management structure. The newly appointed Bank management claimed the bank was trying to stem out its "Jamat-e-Islami roots". This sudden change, however, has led the bank to a financial crisis. In 2022, many media outlets reported that the bank was giving out loans to suspicious businesses without proper verification.

Awards of IBBL
Global Finance, a reputed US-based quarterly magazine, awarded IBBL as the best bank of Bangladesh for the Year 1999, 2000, 2004 and 2005, and the best Islamic financial institution of Bangladesh every year from 2008 to 2013.

See also about Banks

 Banking in Bangladesh

References

External links 

 IBBL Official website
 IBBL CellFin: Your Digital Wallet | Procedure & Details

Islamic banks of Bangladesh
Banks established in 1983
Bangladeshi companies established in 1983